Cognitive academic language proficiency (CALP) is a language-related term developed by Jim Cummins which refers to formal academic learning, as opposed to BICS. In schools today, the terms BICS and CALP are most frequently used to discuss the language proficiency levels of students who are in the process of acquiring a new language. These students typically develop proficiency in BICS well before they acquire a strong grasp of CALP or academic language. As a result, students may initially appear fully proficient and fluent, while still struggling with significant language gaps. 

In 1996, ethnographic study of Salvadorean students in Washington, D.C., Carolyn Vincent found that the students' language attainments were "largely deceptive". Students were less proficient than they appeared because they were able "to converse on a few every day, frequently discussed subjects" but often lacked proficiency in academic language. Carolyn Edelsky was an early critic of the BICS/CALP distinction, arguing that academic language is measured inaccurately through a reliance on "test-wiseness". Cummins countered this by noting that academic language proficiency does not rely "on test scores as support for either its construct validity or relevance to education". Further, it is tempting for teachers and administrators to move students with a high BICS (Basic Interpersonal Communication Skills/Social Language Proficiency) level into a 'mainstream' class because they 'sound' like the other kids on the playground.

Although the terms BICS and CALP are still widely used, Cummins has more recently used the terms conversational language and academic language. Instructors in bilingual educational environments, Cummins tells us, should be mindful that a student's apparent ability to interact at a high cognitive level on the 'street' does not necessarily imply the same cognitive or communications ability in the 'class'. Cummins insists that a more thorough assessment of the student's academic language abilities be performed before moving the student out of a 'sheltered' language development environment.

References

Pedagogy